James Featherstone may refer to:

Jim Featherstone (1923–2014), English rugby league footballer who played in the 1940s and 1950s
James Featherstone (footballer) (born 1979), English footballer